Sugata Bose (born 7 September 1956) is an Indian historian and politician who has taught and worked in the United States since the mid-1980s. His fields of study are South Asian and Indian Ocean history. Bose taught at Tufts University until 2001, when he accepted the Gardiner Chair of Oceanic History and Affairs at Harvard University. Bose is also the director of the Netaji Research Bureau in Kolkata, India, a research center and archives devoted to the life and work of Bose's great uncle, the Indian nationalist, Subhas Chandra Bose. Bose is the author most recently of His Majesty's Opponent: Subhas Chandra Bose and India's Struggle against Empire (2011) and A Hundred Horizons: The Indian Ocean in the Age of Global Empire (2006).

From 2014 to 2019, Bose has served as a Member of India's Parliament from the Jadavpur Constituency in West Bengal with his party affiliation in Mamata Banerjee-led All India Trinamool Congress (TMC).

Early life and family
Sugata Bose was born in Calcutta, India. After studying at Presidency College, Kolkata, University of Calcutta Bose subsequently completed his PhD at the University of Cambridge before being named a research fellow of St. Catharine's College at Cambridge in 1981.

The grandnephew of Indian nationalist Subhas Chandra Bose and grandson of nationalist Sarat Chandra Bose. His father was paediatrician and legslator Sisir Kumar Bose and his mother was educator and legislator Krishna Bose. Bose's brother, Sumantra Bose, teaches at the London School of Economics; his sister, Sarmila Bose, is a researcher at Oxford University.

Academic career
After completing his PhD at Cambridge, Sugata Bose began his career as a professor of history and diplomacy at Tufts University. In 2001 Bose was appointed to the Gardiner Chair of Oceanic History and Affairs at Harvard University, a position that had lain vacant for almost two decades, one which had been previously occupied by historians of the Western Hemisphere, but one for which Harvard specifically wanted a historian of South Asia. From 2003 to 2010, Bose headed up the university's South Asia initiative as well as the graduate program in the history department.

Books
In 2011 Bose published His Majesty's Opponent: Subhas Chandra Bose and India's Struggle against Empire, a biography of his great uncle Subhas Bose. The biography, a trade book, has been criticised in scholarly reviews for soft-pedaling or oversimplifying Subhas Chandra Bose's alliances with Italian Fascism, German National Socialism, and Japanese imperialism.  The book has also been criticised for its optimistic speculations on what Subhas Bose might have accomplished had he lived. Some popular reviews have been more positive.

Instead, Bose contends, in the main thesis of his book, an inter-regional economy of middle-level bazaar merchants and traders continued well into the late 1920s, existing between the dominant European capitalists at the top and the peasants and peddlers at the bottom. This according to Bose, was not just the case in the market of goods and services, but also in the barter of ideas and culture. Attempting to bolster the latter notion are sections in the book on Mohandas K. Gandhi, Rabindranath Tagore, and Bose's great uncle Subhas Chandra Bose. A Hundred Horizons was praised by academic reviewers for explicating the transformations to networks which linked Indian Ocean societies, beyond the influence of colonial empires, and for exploring "cosmopolitan notions of anticolonialism" throughout the Indian Ocean world. However, Bose's delineation of that economy has been criticised for not going much beyond India and Indians, for reducing the complex exchange between the British and India to a clash of Indian nationalism and British authoritarianism; and for not providing sufficient warrant for the main thesis in the book.

Bose is also the author and editor of books on the economic, social and political history of modern South Asia.  Beginning his career with work on the economy of agrarian Bengal, Bose published two volumes on his research. Agrarian Bengal: Economy, Social Structure and Politics, 1919–1947, published in 1986, contextualised rural economic life within the wider currents of the global economy, while a 1993 contribution to the New Cambridge History of India, Peasant Labour and Colonial Capital: Rural Bengal since 1770, analysed two and a half centuries of regional economic and social change.

Political career
Sugata Bose was a Trinamool Congress MP (2014 -2019) at the 16th Lok Sabha, representing the Jadavpur constituency.

Other activities
In January 2012, Bose joined New Yorker editor David Remnick, former New York Times editor Joseph Lelyveld and journalist Peter Popham at the sixth Jaipur Literature Festival in a panel on the challenges of biographical writing.

Bose has been active in researching, speaking, and publishing on Rabindranath Tagore, contributing to projects across different media. In 2007, Krishna and Sugata Bose co-edited Purabi: the East in its Feminine Gender, a book and CD of Tagore's poetry and music. Bose has produced a four-CD set of Tagore's songs written outside of India as Visva Yatri Rabindranath, and has lectured widely on Tagore in North America, Europe, and Asia.

Beyond his work at Harvard and Tufts, Bose has helped steer two major projects advancing higher education in India. Since 2007, Bose has been a member of the Government of India's Nalanda Mentor Group, which seeks to establish an international university on the site of the ancient University of Nalanda in Bihar. Since 2011, Bose has served as chairman of the Presidency College Mentor Group, which seeks to revitalise the 194-year-old Kolkata college. He also served on the Social Sciences jury for the Infosys Prize in 2009, and the Humanities jury in 2015 and 2016.

Bibliography

Books

Chapters in books

Notes

Cited Sources

Further reading
 Anjali Puri, Lunch With BS: Sugata Bose, Business Standard, 4 March 2016.

External links

 
 Faculty page at Harvard University History Department

1956 births
Alumni of the University of Cambridge
21st-century American historians
21st-century American male writers
American people of Bengali descent
Bengali historians
Bengali Hindus
20th-century Bengalis
21st-century Bengalis
Bengali writers
Harvard University faculty
Historians of South Asia
Living people
Politicians from Kolkata
Presidency University, Kolkata alumni
Tufts University faculty
University of Calcutta alumni
India MPs 2014–2019
Lok Sabha members from West Bengal
American people of Indian descent
Trinamool Congress politicians from West Bengal
People from South 24 Parganas district
American male non-fiction writers
Indian scholars
21st-century Indian scholars
20th-century Indian scholars
Indian historical novelists
Scholars from Kolkata
Indian historians
20th-century Indian historians
21st-century Indian historians
Indian writers
20th-century Indian writers
20th-century Indian non-fiction writers
20th-century male writers
21st-century Indian non-fiction writers
Indian non-fiction writers
Indian male non-fiction writers
Indian biographers
21st-century Indian biographers
Indian academics
Indian social sciences writers
Indian economics writers
Indian political writers